Rutgers Campus Buses are a zero-fare bus service used by students at Rutgers University campuses. It is the second-largest bus service in New Jersey after NJ Transit, and one of the largest university bus systems in the United States. Service is provided by First Transit year-round, including weekends and holidays. Late night shuttle service for students is provided by Rutgers Department of Transportation Services (known as the "Knight Mover") when the New Brunswick campus transit system is not in service. Football and other event shuttles are operated by Academy Bus Lines.

History

From July 1, 2001 to June 30, 2011, Rutgers New Brunswick Campus bus service was provided by Academy Bus Lines. Prior to that, Suburban Transit was the operator.

Rutgers began to install new bus shelters in the summer of 2010. The new shelters incorporate red roofs to cast a red tone on the sidewalk, showcasing university colors.

Director Jack Molenaar announced that the L route would be discontinued due to budget cuts, effective 28 August 2010. Molenaar called the bus a "relic" and said it was "slowest and most underutilized" of the bus routes. There was significant opposition to the move, especially from graduate students and Highland Park residents who had already made housing arrangements expecting the bus to be there. After 600 people signed an online petition calling for its reinstitution, a temporary LXc route was created for the 2010-11 school year, stopping at Cedar Lane every 30 minutes. A second bus was later added to shorten wait times to 15 minutes. In addition, the three weekend buses (A, EE, L) were reorganized into two all campus loop buses (Weekend 1 and Weekend 2).

On October 21, 2010, First Transit was awarded a 5-year contract with an option to extend up to 15 years for the operation of New Brunswick Campus shuttle system. The main reason cited for the switch is cost. First Transit will refurbish existing buses and supply new ones for a total of 50 buses featured automatic stop announcements, whereas now drivers may or may not announce stops.

On December 10, 2010, Academy filed a lawsuit against the University over the loss of the contract. Despite the loss of shuttle operations, the company continues to provide the chartered bus operations used for tours and football games.

First Transit expanded their bus service to the Newark Campus beginning September 1, 2014; to Camden Campus since September 1, 2019. The new Rutgers-logo fleet of buses utilize the NextBus system and real-time status is available via the official Rutgers app. Rutgers replaced the NextBus system with TransLoc after 7/1/2018.

Alternative plans
Several times over the past decade, it has been suggested that the bus system be partially or fully replaced with bus rapid transit (BRT), monorail, or light rail. Closing College Avenue to non-bus motor vehicle traffic was also proposed, but indefinitely canceled in February 2010, due to excessive costs. Current plans are for incorporating the Rutgers bus system into the proposed New Brunswick Bus Rapid Transit, which would be centered on the New Brunswick Station near the intersection of Route 18 and Route 27.

Routes

New Brunswick Campus

There are currently 10 routes on weekdays, 2 routes on weekends, and 1 route on holidays for New Brunswick campus.

Weekday routes
As of Spring 2023.

The Knight Mover operates when weekday buses stop running.

Weekends and breaks
In Spring 2021, a variation of the weekend routes were introduced. They are essentially an express version of the regular weekend routes, stopping only at the stops served by the color routes on each campus. In Fall 2021, a revised version of previous Letter Routes with redundant stops eliminated was introduced. Weekend Routes were also based on revised Letter Routes.

Special event shuttles
Buses for the following routes are not trackable.

Former routes

Color Routes
In Fall 2020, 6 Color Routes were introduced to help with social distancing on Rutgers buses due to COVID-19. They were based on regular intercampus routes, but featured less stops to reduce students traveling time on bus. These routes were implemented on August 26, 2020. However, due to low ridership, these routes were discontinued after October 2, 2020 and weekend routes were used until the end of Spring 2021 semester.
In early 2021, Color Routes were planned to continue in Fall 2021. However, this plan was scrapped in summer 2021, and Letter Routes were brought back for Fall 2021 with slight modifications.

Shuttles

Routes Operated Under Previous Contractors
The majority of the below routes ran throughout the late 20th Century as alternative variants or service patterns of the current routes.

Newark Campus

There are currently 4 routes on weekdays and 1 night service running seven nights a week for Newark campus.

Weekday routes 

The Newark Penn Station Midnight Express Security Shuttle operates between 12:00AM and 4:00AM every day, providing transportation between Newark Penn Station and the Rutgers Newark Campus via Boyden Hall.

Former routes

Camden Campus

Bus routes for Camden campus only operate on weekdays.

Fleet

Current Fleet

On Order
As of October 2021, a multi-year order of diesel ENC Axess BRT 40' buses has been placed to replace the current ElDorado and New Flyer buses. These buses will feature same paint scheme as 202-203 and 205, with all aisle-facing seating (35 seats total), 8 sets of dual USB power ports on seatings & rear deck. All buses in this order are owned by Rutgers University and operated by First Transit.

Gallery

References

External links
 
 Rutgers Department of Transportation Services
 New Brunswick Campus Buses
 Newark Campus Buses
 Camden Shuttle
 "Steve's Bus Terminal-version 4.0" - historical information about Rutgers Bus routes. Vo, Steven (2014).

|}

Surface transportation in Greater New York
Rutgers University
University and college bus systems
New Brunswick, New Jersey
Piscataway, New Jersey
Bus transportation in New Jersey
Transportation in Newark, New Jersey
Transportation in Essex County, New Jersey
Transportation in Middlesex County, New Jersey
Zero-fare transport services